Get A Life is a Living reality television show hosted by Jodie Marsh, which premiered 1 March 2007. The show consisted of five shy, nervous, unconfident and low self-esteemed participants who want to change their personalities for the better. Each of the five participants is assigned a mentor—someone he or she aspired to be like, at the top of their social ladder, confident, with a positive outlook on life. The mentors' job is to motivate their protégés throughout the show, giving them words of wisdom and encouragement.

It was reported by the website Digital Spy on 16 March that Living had cancelled the show after just two episodes.  However a third episode aired on Living2 on 20 March.

Format
The ten contestants reside in a large house for the four-week duration of the show's filming. There are five bedrooms, each one containing a participant and their mentor. The group is regularly driven to various locations and tasked with specialised teamwork-oriented challenges on which they are later graded. Once a week, an expert arrives at the house to teach a "masterclass" on various things the contestants need to improve upon. After four challenges, someone will be asked to leave the house. Each episode is an hour long (including adverts), except for the first episode which was an hour and a half.

Ironically, the contestants are awarded points based on how well they perform in the challenges, and so the person with the fewest points would logically be the one most in need of the help being given on the show. Yet it is the person with the fewest points that is dismissed.

The contestants are filmed at all times, and also have access to a diary room in which they can vent their true feelings.

Series 1

Participants

Mentors

Episode One

Synopsis
Aired 1 March 2007. The first episode spanned the first six days in the house. Two challenges were performed, with one masterclass in between. The first challenge was a military-style obstacle course, including swinging over a pool of water on a rope, crawling under barbed wire and climbing a wall. The first masterclass was about general confidence, and saw the participants writing their flaws on six boxes. They then arranged these boxes like a wall that metaphorically stood between them and the rest of their life, and proceeded to demolish that wall. Finally, the second challenge took place in an old Elizabethan home, Kentwell Hall. The contestants were given a tour by its owner Patrick Phillips, after which the participants were each assigned a room in which they had to play the role of tour guide.

Everyone seemed to bond well with their mentors, except for Matty. He and Jermaine were constantly at odds with each other, with Jermaine feeling that Matty wasn't grateful for the help he was providing, and Matty feeling that Jermaine wasn't interested in helping him at all. They appeared to leave things amicably after the second challenge, but at 6 am the next morning Jermaine unexpectedly left the house. Matty was told he would have another mentor, Adrian, by the start of the next challenge.

At the end of the episode, four of the five pairs were in joint second place with 6 points, with Anneka and Pam taking the lead with 9 points.

Scores

Episode Two

Synopsis
Aired 8 March 2007. The second episode covered days 7 and 8. Comedian Mark Dolan visited to conduct a masterclass on heckling, in which first everyone had to insult each other (in a roleplaying context) and then give as good as they'd received. Then, the contestants split off into their pairs to conduct the following individual roleplaying scenarios:
 Matty as his new mentor Adrian's boss, needing to fire him
 Esther having to defend her place in a supermarket queue to pusher-in Lucy
 Anneka needing to kick flaky lodger Pam out of her apartment
 Paul having to deny Rob, an obviously lying customer, a refund on a mobile phone
 Sol having to tell proud father Nick that he'd decided not to attend Oxford University

This episode also gave focus to the possible relationship forming between Paul and Anneka. He told her he liked her as more than a friend, but then confused her by withdrawing. Footage of them both in the diary room at separate times was spliced together to show that they both like each other, but assume those feelings aren't returned because she thinks she's a "loser" and he thinks he's a "minger". Afterwards, Anneka wrote him a love note on the back of a torn up cereal box.

At the end of the episode, Anneka and Pam were still in the lead with 12 points, while Esther and Lucy were lagging behind in last place with 8.

Scores

Episode Three

Synopsis
Aired 20 March 2007. The third episode covered days 10, 11 and 12. Celebrity stylist Ashley Rossiter visited to conduct a masterclass on style in preparation for the next day's challenge. Unfortunately, Adrian decided that Matty was not what he'd been expecting and that he could not help him. He and Matty went to Jodie, and Adrian confessed he wished to leave. Unfortunately, the show would not provide Matty with a third mentor, and as a result he was asked to leave the house as well. This goes a long way towards explaining why Matty was the only contestant to not be ask to be interviewed for the Living website at the end of the show's filming but then again the show's producers did in fact treat him badly for the short time he was in the house.

The next day, the remaining four mentors were taken to a shopping centre to buy a new wardrobe for their charges. Each had a budget of £100, and needed to get something appropriate for a dinner party to be held that night. They were also tasked with incorporating the style advice given to them the previous day. Meanwhile, the four contestants stayed at the house to receive hair and makeup from a professional stylist. The dinner went well, with almost everyone displaying a previously unseen level of confidence. That night, on Rob had a talk with Paul about his relationship with Anneka, and the possible ramifications it might be having on their level of commitment to the show. The following night, after the challenge's scores had been announced, Paul told her he wanted to "cool down" whatever relationship they'd been having.

At the end of the episode, four of the five pairs were in joint second place with 14 points, while Esther and Lucy were lagging behind in last place with 13. This would have meant Esther's dismissal from the house, but as Matty had already been asked to leave earlier in the episode, she gained a reprieve.

Scores

Reviews
 4 March 2007 - "Jodie On A Loser"

Notes
Due to poor viewer ratings the show was moved from its prime original slot of Thursdays at 8 pm on Living to Tuesdays at 10.30 pm evening on Living2. Living2 chose to show only one episode on 20 March 2007.

References

British reality television series
2007 British television series debuts
2007 British television series endings